Tour CB21, formerly Tour Gan, is an office skyscraper located in La Défense, the high-rise business district situated west of Paris, France. It was designed by celebrated American architect Max Abramovitz.

Built from 1972 to 1974, the tower is 179 m (587 ft) tall at roof height. However, it reaches 187 m (614 ft) once including the antenna located on the roof. It is the fourth-tallest skyscraper in La Défense after Tour First, Tour Total and Tour Areva. Its ground shape is in the form of a Greek cross.

In 1972, during construction, a protest campaign opposed the building of Tour Gan. Protesters demanded a reduction in height. However, the tower was completed at the planned height.

Today, the main tenants are Suez Environnement and AIG France.

The structure is owned by Fonciere des Regions.

See also 
 Skyscraper
 La Défense
 List of tallest structures in Paris

External links 
 Tour GAN (Emporis)
 CB21 Website (Covivio)

References

CB21
CB21
Office buildings completed in 1974
Harrison & Abramovitz buildings
Buildings and structures completed in 1974